Fuat Hüsnü Kayacan (1879, Kadıköy, Istanbul – 1963, Istanbul) was a Turkish footballer, manager, referee and pioneering figure. He was the first ever Turkish footballer and referee. He got involved in the sport of football when he was a soldier on assignment in İzmir in 1898. He was the younger brother of Hamit Hüsnü Kayacan.

Being a native of the Kadıköy district on the Asian side of Istanbul, Kayacan was among the founding line-ups of both Black Stockings FC and Fenerbahçe. He also played for Galatasaray.

References

1879 births
1963 deaths
19th-century people from the Ottoman Empire
Turkish footballers
Fenerbahçe football managers
Galatasaray S.K. footballers
Ottoman Navy officers
Association footballers not categorized by position
Turkish football managers
People from Kadıköy
Footballers from Istanbul